"Black Magic" is a song by American rapper Eminem from the deluxe edition of his eleventh studio album Music to Be Murdered By. It was released as the album's second track on December 18, 2020 via Shady Records along with the rest of Music to Be Murdered By: Side B (Deluxe Edition). Written by Eminem, Skylar Grey, Jayson DeZuzio, Elliott Taylor and Luis Resto, it was produced by Grey and DeZuzio with additional production from Eminem. The song features vocals by American singer and Em's frequent collaborator Skylar Grey, marking their ninth song together following 2011 "I Need a Doctor", 2012 "Our House" and "C'mon Let Me Ride", 2013 "Asshole", 2014 "Twisted", 2016 "Kill for You", 2017 "Tragic Endings", and 2020 "Leaving Heaven".

The song debuted at number 100 on the UK Singles Chart and number 20 on the UK R&B Singles Chart.

Personnel
Marshall Mathers – main artist, vocals, additional producer, songwriter
Holly Brook Hafermann – featured artist, vocals, producer, songwriter
Jayson DeZuzio – producer, songwriter
Luis Resto – keyboards, songwriter
Elliott Taylor – songwriter
Mike Strange – recording, mixing
Tony Campana – recording

Charts

References

2020 songs
Eminem songs
Skylar Grey songs
Songs written by Eminem
Songs written by Skylar Grey
Song recordings produced by Eminem
Songs written by Luis Resto (musician)